Kotipizza Group Oyj is a Finnish restaurant group focused on fast casual dining. The Group consists of three companies, Kotipizza Oyj has 290 franchise-operated restaurants in Finland, The Social Burger Joint Oy engages in restaurant operations and the third group company, Helsinki Foodstock Oy, provides food-related supply, logistics and selection services for a number of chain-managed companies. Its customers include the Kotipizza chain and other significant fast food operators.  Kotipizza Group had total net sales of EUR84.1m in the financial year 2017 and EBIT of EUR6.4m. At the time the Group's shares were listed on the main list of Nasdaq OMX Helsinki.

In November 2018 Orkla ASA announced that it will acquire Kotipizza Group. Kotipizza is Orkla’s largest brand in Finland.

History

Early phases 1987–2010 
The first Kotipizza restaurant was opened in  Vaasa in 1987. The chain was founded by Rabbe Grönblom.

In 2003, Tommi Tervanen founded Foodstock Oy, which started cooperation with Kotipizza. In 2005, a company called Ab R. Grönblom International Ltd (RGI), owned by Rabbe Grönblom, also the owner of Kotipizza, acquired 90% of the share capital of Foodstock. After the acquisition, Frankis Finland Oy owned by RGI had two subsidiaries, Kotipizza and Foodstock.

Frankis Group 2011–2014 
In 2011, the funds managed by Sentica Partners acquired a majority holding in Frankis Finland as well as the shares in Foodstock held by minority shareholders — and Frankis Group Oyj was created. In the same year, Frankis Group's first 55 Burger, Cola & Fries fast food chain restaurant was opened. The chain was sold in 2014 to Jokes Family Oy, which was in charge of Rolls restaurant chain.

In 2012, former CEO of Helsinki Foodstock Tommi Tervanen was appointed as the CEO of Frankis Group.

In 2014, Frankis Group was owned by the funds managed by private equity company Sentica Partners, CEO Tommi Tervanen and other key persons of the company. In December, the company sold its Francount business operations to Accountor. Francount was an accounting office that offered bookkeeping and other accounting services for companies in the field of hotel and restaurant operations. Its largest customer group was Kotipizza chain franchisees.

Kotipizza Group 2015–2018 
Frankis Group Oyj changed its name to Kotipizza Group Oyj in March 2015.  Furthermore, the company's domicile was changed from Vaasa to Helsinki. On 21 May 2015, Kotipizza Group Oyj announced its plan to carry out an IPO and become listed on the main list of the Helsinki Stock Exchange. The IPO was launched on 5 June 2015. The company had first had plans for an IPO in 2000. After going public, a fund of private equity company Sentica, Sentica Buyout III, was the largest shareowner of the company, holding 61% of the company's share capital. Other major shareowners of the company were pension insurance companies and investment funds. In the 2015 financial year, net sales grew 7.9% to EUR 56.4 million. The company closed down its unprofitable restaurants and founded the Mexican-style Chalupa chain.

In February 2017, Sentica sold its holding in Kotipizza Group and Kotipizza announced that it had acquired Pizzataxi. In September 2017, the company launched its Kotipizza Go pizza slice concept. In November 2017, the Group acquired a majority holding in Day After Day, a company in charge of the Social Food Street Burgerjoint restaurant and a food truck called Social Food that appears at various events. In addition, the Group announced its plans to develop the company into a chain. The founders of the company, Mika Tuomonen and Herkko Volanen, continued as minority shareowners and restaurateurs of Social Burgerjoint. In December 2017, the Group announced its plans to launch a new restaurant concept, No Pizza, aimed at international markets. The plan was to open the first restaurant of the concept in the Nordic countries in 2018. During the same month, the Kotipizza chain's monthly sales exceeded EUR 10 million for the first time.

In February 2018, Kotipizza announced its plans to establish a new lunch restaurant concept. Collaboration partners were sought for the Tasty Market lunch restaurant concept with which the Group planned to open restaurants, for instance in business parks.

Kotipizza Group and Orkla 2018-current
In November 2018 European consumer goods manufacturer Orkla announced that it will acquire Kotipizza Group. With the acquisition Orkla wanted to increase their presence in channels that were growing faster than traditional grocery business. Orkla’s intention was that Kotipizza shall continue its operations as an independent company under Orkla's control and keep its franchise model.

In February 2019 Orkla had 99,3% of the company’s shares. In June Orkla had acquired all of Kotipizza Group’s shares and the company was delisted.

In January 2020 Kotipizza Group sold Chalupa Oy and the chain’s ten restaurants to Think Drinks Oy.

Organization 

The Group consists of Kotipizza, The Social Burger Joint Oy and the sourcing and logistics company Helsinki Foodstock Oy. In 2021, Kotipizza Group employed about 100 people. 

Kotipizza Group’s owner Orkla is one of the largest listed companies in Norway. It is the Nordic and Baltic region's largest grocery brand supplier: it has a total of 300 brands, which are sold in over one hundred countries. 

In spring 2021 the board of Kotipizza Group consisted of Chairperson Kenneth Haavet and Pasi Flinkman, Thomas Ljungqvist, Johanna Paavola, Kalle Ruuskanen and Aaron Moore-Saxton.

Kotipizza 

Kotipizza Oyj is the largest pizza restaurant chain in the Nordic Countries and it operates a pizza franchise in Finland. In 2021 the chain had over 290 restaurants and nearly 300 franchisees.

Social Burgerjoint 

Social Food Street Burgerjoint, founded by Mika Tuomonen and Herkko Volanen in January 2017 in Sörnäinen Helsinki. Tuomonen won the MasterChef Finland competition in 2012. Kotipizza Group acquired the business in November the same year and turned Social Burgerjoint into a chain. In 2021 Social Burgerjoint had nine restaurants in Finland.

Helsinki Foodstock
Helsinki Foodstock was founded by Tommi Tervanen in 2003. In 2018 Kotipizza’s franchisees bought all their ingredients from Foodstock, while over half of Foodstock’s sales came from other restaurant chains.

Corporate social responsibility 

Kotipizza supports, among others, Plan International in Finland.
In 2017, the Kotipizza chain received the MSC ecolabel, confirming that all fish and seafood served by the chain come from sustainable sources and certified fisheries. Kotipizza was the first pizza chain in the world to be licensed to use the label. Products with the MSC ecolabel are guaranteed to have been responsibly caught by a certified sustainable fishery.[33] MSC (Marine Stewardship Council) is an international non-profit organisation established to address the problem of unsustainable fishing and safeguard seafood.

In Autumn 2018 Kotipizza Group took part in the "Ykkösketjuun" campaign which promoted the need for corporate responsibility legislation in Finland. 

Since October 2019, Kotipizza has been a member of ResQ Club. Restaurants use the ResQ Club app to sell surplus products such as pizzas with wrong toppings.

Kotipizza takes part in Mission Zero Foodprint which is a project that aims to develop a carbon-neutral ways of working and to reduce food waste in restaurants.

Recognition 

 In 2015, The Finnish Association of Marketing, Technology and Creativity (MTL) and PR Agency Manifesto awarded the Pizza Guy blog by Kotipizza Group's CEO Tommi Tervanen the prize for best business blog in Finland.
 In 2016, Sustainable Brand Index studied the most sustainable brands in the Nordics. Kotipizza was ranked as the most sustainable of all fast food restaurants. Second place was shared by Hesburger and Subway.
 In November 2017, private investors selected the top companies listed on NASDAQ OMX Helsinki in the annual Yksityissijoittajien valinta (Private Investors’ Choice) competition organised by Pörssisäätiö, Kreab and Helsinki Fair Ltd. Kotipizza won the first place in the category of small-sized companies.

References

External links 
 Kotipizza Group
 Pizza Guy blog

2011 establishments in Finland
Pizzerias
Companies based in Helsinki
Pizza chains
Companies formerly listed on Nasdaq Helsinki